Anoplagonus occidentalis is a fish in the family [Agonidae]]. It was described by Georgii Ustinovich Lindberg in 1950. It is a marine fish which dwells in temperate waters, and is known from Japan, in the northwestern Pacific Ocean. It dwells at a depth range of 40–120 metres. Males can reach a maximum standard length of 10 centimetres.

References

occidentalis
Taxa named by Georgii Ustinovich Lindberg
Fish described in 1950